The Pic de la Munia culminating at  is the highest point of the three cirques of Troumouse, Barroude and Barrosa. It is located on the border between France (Hautes-Pyrénées department) and Spain (Huesca province).

Toponymy 
Era Munia could mean "nun", from « moniale », of Spanish origin. Otherwise, it could stem from Latin, moenia meaning « walls », which corresponds to its relief.

Access 
There are three main access routes which lead to the summit of la Munia.

The first, most direct and most frequented, runs along the impressive north face, in the vast cirque de Troumouse. The starting point is located at the Troumouse car park, at about 2,100 m. The ascent is a bit technical (PD), with two delicate passages : a first small wall (III-) that one needs to climb before arriving at the col de la Munia, then the cat's footstep (II) shortly before the summit ~ all this achieved in a spectacular high mountain landscape. After having reached the col de la Munia (at 2,853 m), the route leading to the summit is clear-cut, leading straight east, by a sharp ridge.

The second starts south, in the Pineta valley at about 1,900 m. A path leads (without any major difficulty) to the col de la Munia, this time from the other side of the mountain. The ascent concludes the same way as the first route.

The third, begins at Troumouse car park, but runs through the most eastern point of the cirque. The ascent is made along the crest, from east to west.

See also 
 List of Pyrenean three-thousanders

References 

Mountains of the Pyrenees
Mountains of Hautes-Pyrénées
Pyrenean three-thousanders